West Central High School may refer to:

West Central High School (Illinois), near Biggsville, Illinois
West Central High School (Indiana), near Francesville, Indiana